Berbice Creole Dutch (also known as Berbice Dutch) is a now extinct Dutch creole language, once spoken in Berbice, a region along the Berbice River in Guyana. It had a lexicon largely based on Dutch and Eastern Ijo varieties from southern Nigeria. In contrast to the widely known Negerhollands Dutch creole spoken in the Virgin Islands, Berbice Creole Dutch and its relative Skepi Creole Dutch, were more or less unknown to the outside world until Ian Robertson first reported on the two languages in 1975. Dutch linguist Silvia Kouwenberg subsequently investigated the creole language, publishing its grammar in 1994, and numerous other works examining its formation and uses.

History 
Berbice was settled in 1627 by the Dutchman Abraham van Peere. A few years later, Suriname was settled by Englishmen Lord Willoughby and Lawrence Hyde under a grant from the English King, Charles II. In the beginning, therefore, Suriname was a British and Berbice a Dutch possession.

On 22 April 1796, the British occupied the territory. On 27 March 1802, Berbice was restored to the Batavian Republic (the then-current name of the Netherlands). In September 1803, the British occupied the territory again. On 13 August 1814, Berbice became a British colony. The colony was formally ceded to Britain by the Netherlands on 20 November 1815.

Throughout the 1700's sugar and cacao plantations were numerous throughout the Berbice region. These plantations created close contact between numerous language groups as slaves were transported in from surrounding areas. The enslaved populations largely consisted of the indigenous Arawak Amerindian people of the surrounding Berbice region, and enslaved people shipped in from the Bight of Biafra. Thus, the initial contact situation consisted of Indigenous Arawak speakers, Eastern Ijo varieties from the Bight of Biafra, and Dutch colonizers mostly speaking southwestern varieties from Zeeland.

A Dutch Arawak pidgin was developed early on in this time period and later contributed in the development of Berbice Dutch. It is believed that the language was largely constructed by children born locally into these plantations. Many of which are thought to be of mixed ancestry between the enslaved population and the mainly single Dutchmen.

One-third of the basic words in Berbice Dutch Creole, including words for 'eat', 'know', and 'speak' are of Niger–Congo origin in West Africa, from a single language-cluster, the Eastern Ijaw languages. The language borrowed its lexicon largely from Dutch (57%) and Eastern Ijo (38%), with only 1% of its lexicon stemming from Arawak varieties. It is considered a unique Creole language because it consists of only one African language influence, with 0% of its structure or lexicon stemming from parts of Africa outside of Eastern Ijo. It is suspected that the cause of this is a lack of diversity in groups of enslaved Africans in the region. At the time, slaves from the Bight of Biafra were considered undesirable. Due to Berbice's relatively small size, they would use undesirable slaves as they were cheaper, leading to a single language coming over from Africa, though in multiple varieties.

Compared to Negerhollands and Skepi Creole Dutch, other contact languages from the area, Berbice Dutch is typologically closer to Dutch but lexically farthest from it. It is not based on a Hollandic dialect of Dutch (the dialect that is closest to the modern standard of the Dutch Language Union) but on Zeelandic.

The language was originally spoken along the Wiruni Creek and the Berbice River where plantations were often located. The language survived on the upper reaches of the Berbice River, the areas around which the old Dutch colony of Berbice was concentrated prior to a shift downriver to the coast in the 19th century. This shift was accompanied by the area being claimed by Britain in 1814. Berbice became part of the British Guiana at this time and a new English-lexified Creole emerged. As missionaries and enslaved people from Barbados arrived, this new Creole gained popularity and Berbice Dutch started to disappear.

For the next century, small groups of multi-lingual mixed heritage people continued to live in the original location up-river and spoke Berbice Dutch.

The language came into decay in the 20th century and by 1993, there were some 4 or 5 elderly speakers of the language left, although other sources report tens of speakers. The last speakers of Berbice Dutch were found in the 1970s by Professor Ian Robertson of the University of the West Indies. These Amerindian speakers were living on the upper reaches of the Berbice River in and around the area of the Wiruni Creek.

Dutch linguist Silvia Kouwenberg did further investigations on the language and published a grammar in 1994 as well as a variety of other works relating to the language.

The last known Berbice Dutch Creole speaker was Albertha Bell, who was 103 years old when last interviewed by Ian Robertson and a UWI linguistics research team in March 2004.

Extinction
In February 2010, the language was declared officially extinct, according to an article in the March issue of the Dutch edition of National Geographic magazine. In the '80s there was still a small number of Berbice speakers in Guyana but since then it has been discovered that the last speaker, Albertha Bell, died in 2005, the international language database Ethnologue had declared it extinct.

Phonology

Vowels

There is a large degree of free variation in the vowels, with the range of realizations of the phonemes overlapping.

Consonants

 and  occur only in loanwords from Guyanese Creole.

References

Other Reading

External links

APiCS Online - Survey chapter: Berbice Dutch
Interview with the last living speaker of Berbice Creole Dutch

Dutch-based pidgins and creoles
Dutch language in the Americas
Languages of Guyana
Extinct languages of South America
Languages extinct in the 2000s
Creoles of the Americas